"The Abolition of Work" is an essay written by Bob Black in 1985. It was part of Black's first book, an anthology of essays entitled The Abolition of Work and Other Essays published  by Loompanics Unlimited. It is an exposition of Black's "type 3 anarchism" – a blend of post-Situationist theory and individualist anarchism – focusing on a critique of the work ethic. Black draws upon certain ideas of Marshall Sahlins, Richard Borshay Lee, Charles Fourier, William Morris, and Paul Goodman.

Although "The Abolition of Work" has most often been reprinted by anarchist publishers and Black is well known as an anarchist, the essay's argument is not explicitly anarchist. Black argues that the abolition of work is as important as the abolition of the state. The essay, which is based on a 1981 speech at the Gorilla Grotto in San Francisco, is informal and without academic references, but Black mentions some sources such as the utopian socialist Charles Fourier, the unconventional Marxists Paul Lafargue and William Morris, anarchists such as Peter Kropotkin and Paul Goodman, and anthropologists such as Marshall Sahlins and Richard Borshay Lee.

Synopsis

In the essay Black argues for the abolition of the producer- and consumer-based society, where, Black contends, all of life is devoted to the production and consumption of commodities. Attacking Marxist state socialism as much as liberal capitalism, Black argues that the only way for humans to be free is to reclaim their time from jobs and employment, instead turning necessary subsistence tasks into free play done voluntarily – an approach referred to as "ludic". The essay argues that "no-one should ever work", because work – defined as compulsory productive activity enforced by economic or political means – is the source of most of the misery in the world. Black denounces work for its compulsion, and for the forms it takes – as subordination to a boss, as a "job" which turns a potentially enjoyable task into a meaningless chore, for the degradation imposed by systems of work-discipline, and for the large number of work-related deaths and injuries – which Black characterizes as homicide.

He views the subordination enacted in workplaces as "a mockery of freedom", and denounces as hypocrites the various theorists who support freedom while supporting work. Subordination in work, Black alleges, makes people stupid and creates fear of freedom. Because of work, people become accustomed to rigidity and regularity, and do not have the time for friendship or meaningful activity. Many workers, he contends, are dissatisfied with work (as evidenced by absenteeism, goldbricking, embezzlement and sabotage), so that what he says should be uncontroversial; however, it is controversial only because people are too close to the work-system to see its flaws.

Play, in contrast, is not necessarily rule-governed, and, more important, it is performed voluntarily, in complete freedom, for the satisfaction of engaging in the activity itself. But since intrinsically satisfying activity is not necessarily unproductive, "productive play" is possible, and, if generalized, might give rise to a gift economy. Black points out that hunter-gatherer societies are typified by play (in the sense of "productive play"), a view he backs up with the work of anthropologist Marshall Sahlins in his essay "The Original Affluent Society", reprinted in his book Stone Age Economics (1971). Black has reiterated this interpretation of the ethnographic record, this time with citations and references, in "Primitive Affluence", reprinted in his book Friendly Fire (Autonomedia 1994), and in "Nightmares of Reason" (a critique of Murray Bookchin posted at TheAnarchistLibrary.org).

Black responds to the criticism (argued, for instance, by libertarian David Ramsey-Steele) that "work", if not simply effort or energy, is necessary to get important but unpleasant tasks done, by contending that much work now currently done is unnecessary, because it only serves the purposes of social control and economic exploitation. Black has responded that most important tasks can be rendered ludic or "salvaged" by being turned into game-like and craft-like activities, and secondly that the vast majority of work does not need doing at all. The latter tasks are unnecessary because they only serve functions of commerce and social control that exist only to maintain the work-system as a whole. As for what is left, he advocates Charles Fourier's approach of arranging activities so that people will want to do them. He is also sceptical but open-minded about the possibility of eliminating work through labor-saving technologies, which, in his opinion, have so far never reduced work, and often deskilled and debased workers.  As he sees it, the political left has, for the most part, failed to acknowledge as revolutionary the critique of work, limiting itself to the critique of wage-labor. The left, he contends, by glorifying the dignity of labor, has endorsed work itself, and also the work ethic.

Black has often criticized leftism, especially Marxism, but he does not consider anarchism, which he espouses, as always advocating an understanding of work which is consistent with his critique of work.  Black looks favorably, if critically, on a text such as "The Right to Be Greedy", by the Situationist-influenced collective For Ourselves (he wrote a Preface for the Loompanics Unlimited reprint edition), which attempts to synthesize the post-moral individualism of Max Stirner ("The Ego and Its Own") with what appears to be an egalitarian anarcho-communism. What has been called "zero-work" remains controversial on the left and among anarchists.

"The Abolition of Work" has been reprinted, as the first essay of Instead of Work, published by LBC Books in 2015.  Eight more essays follow, including an otherwise unpublished, lengthy essay, "Afterthoughts on the Abolition of Work".  The introduction is by Bruce Sterling.

Influence and reception
"The Abolition of Work" was a significant influence on futurist and design critic Bruce Sterling, who at the time was a leading cyberpunk science fiction author and called it "one of the seminal underground documents of the 1980s". The essay's critique of work formed the basis for the antilabour faction in Sterling's 1988 novel Islands in the Net.  "The Abolition of Work" has been widely reprinted. It has been translated into French, German, Dutch, Spanish, Portuguese (both continental Portuguese and Luso-Brazilian), Swedish, Russian, Arabic, Italian, Serbo-Croatian, Slovenian, Esperanto, Catalan, Azerbaijani (the language of Azerbaijan), and probably other languages.

See also

 Anti-work
 Automation
 Basic income
 Post-work society
 Anarcho-syndicalism
 Libertarian socialism
 Freedom of choice
 Issues in anarchism
 He who does not work, neither shall he eat
 Wage slavery
 Workers of the world, unite!

References

Further reading

External links

The Abolition of Work and Other Essays, the 1986 collection by Bob Black hosted in its entirety on Inspiracy.com
"The Approaching Obsolescence of Housework: A Working-Class Perspective", chapter thirteen of Women, Race & Class, by Angela Davis.

Post-left anarchism
1985 essays
Essays about anarchism
Philosophical literature
Literature critical of work and the work ethic